Alejandro 'Álex' Bernal Carreras (born 3 March 1991) is a Spanish footballer who plays for Marbella as a central midfielder.

Having made four Segunda División appearances for Mirandés, he spent most of his career in Segunda División B, making over 250 appearances for six clubs.

Football career
Born in Seville, Andalusia, Bernal was a product of hometown Real Betis' youth system, and made senior debuts with the reserves in the 2010–11 season in Segunda División B, appearing regularly during his two-year spell with the team.

On 25 July 2012, Bernal joined La Liga club Granada CF: despite appearing with the first team in the pre-season, he was loaned to newly promoted CD Mirandés in Segunda División. He played his first game as a professional on 25 August, featuring the last 14 minutes in a 0–1 away loss against Recreativo de Huelva.

However, after being rarely used, Bernal moved to CD Leganés in the following transfer window, on the same basis. On 22 August 2013, he signed for fellow third level side SD Huesca. Halfway through their title-winning season, having made only one start, he rescinded his contract in January 2015 and moved to La Hoya Lorca CF.

In August 2016, Bernal signed for Mérida AD under manager José Miguel Campos, with whom he had worked at four other teams. He left the club at the midpoint of their doomed campaign on 31 January 2018, joining Marbella FC of the same league on an 18-month contract. At the end of this deal, he got a two-year extension.

References

External links

1991 births
Living people
Spanish footballers
Footballers from Seville
Association football midfielders
Segunda División players
Segunda División B players
Real Betis players
Granada CF footballers
CD Mirandés footballers
CD Leganés players
SD Huesca footballers
Lorca FC players
Mérida AD players
Marbella FC players